Fultot is a commune in the Seine-Maritime department in the Normandy region in northern France.

Geography
The name probably originates from an Old Norse word meaning "intruders", and in Sweden there is the similarly-named village of "Fulltofta". Several other place-names in Normandy and Brittany are also believed to be derived from Scandinavian words.

Population

Places of interest
 The church of St.Martin, dating from the twelfth century.
 The manor house des Autels, first mentioned in the 13th century.

See also
Communes of the Seine-Maritime department

References

Communes of Seine-Maritime